Paganini in Venice is a 1929 German short historical film directed by Frank Clifford and starring Andreas Weißgerber, Hans Hermann Schaufuß, and Ágnes Esterházy. It was made by the newly formed Tobis Film during the switch from silent to sound film.

The film's sets were designed by the art director Erich Czerwonski.

Cast

References

Bibliography

External links

1929 films
Films of the Weimar Republic
German drama short films
German historical films
1920s historical films
Films about classical music and musicians
Biographical films about musicians
Films set in the 19th century
German black-and-white films
Films about violins and violinists
Cultural depictions of Niccolò Paganini
Tobis Film films
1920s German films